Major irrigation project is a classification of irrigation projects used in India. A project with a cultivable command area of more than 10000 hectares is classified as a major irrigation project. Before the Fifth Five-Year Plan, irrigation schemes were classified on the basis of investments needed to implement the scheme. Since the Fifth Five-Year Plan, India has adopted the command area-based system of classification.

References

Irrigation projects
Irrigation in India